Jaleel Scott (born February 23, 1995) is an American football wide receiver who is a free agent. He played college football at New Mexico State, and was drafted by the Baltimore Ravens in the fourth round of the 2018 NFL Draft. He has also been a member of the New York Jets.

Early years
Scott attended and played high school football at Rock Hill High School.

College career
Scott was recruited to play for Maryland but did not qualify academically. He played for three years at Ellsworth Community College and had 45 receptions, 668 yards, nine touchdowns in 2015. Scott had 23 receptions for 283 yards and five touchdowns after transferring to New Mexico State in 2016. The following year, he recorded 1,079 yards and nine touchdowns on 76 receptions. He was a first-team all-conference selection and had a one-handed touchdown catch against Arizona State.

Professional career

Baltimore Ravens
Scott was drafted by the Baltimore Ravens in the fourth round, 132nd overall pick, of the 2018 NFL Draft. He was placed on injured reserve on August 27, 2018.

Scott was waived by the Ravens during final roster cuts on September 5, 2020.

New York Jets
On September 10, 2020, Scott was signed to the New York Jets' practice squad. He was elevated to the active roster on October 31 and December 12 for the team's weeks 8 and 14 games against the Kansas City Chiefs and Seattle Seahawks, and reverted to the practice squad after each game. Scott recorded his second career reception against the Kansas City Chiefs for 16 yards on 1 target. He signed a reserve/future contract with the Jets on January 4, 2021. He was waived on May 7, 2021.

On June 8, 2021, the Atlanta Falcons hosted Scott for a workout.

References

External links
New Mexico State Aggies Bio

1995 births
Living people
American football wide receivers
Baltimore Ravens players
Ellsworth Panthers football players
New Mexico State Aggies football players
New York Jets players
People from Rock Hill, South Carolina
Players of American football from South Carolina
Rock Hill High School (South Carolina) alumni